Rico Richardson (born July 1, 1991) is a former American football wide receiver. He played college football at Jackson State University. He was a member of the Kansas City Chiefs, Houston Texans, Tennessee Titans, Arizona Cardinals, and San Diego Chargers of the National Football League (NFL).

Early years
Richardson was born in Natchez, Mississippi and played high school football at Natchez High School. He was a 1st team All-Region, 1st team All-Metro and 2nd team All-State. He set a Natchez High School receiving record with 3,500 yards. Richardson recorded 46 receptions for 891 yards and seven touchdowns his senior year. He also rushed for 442 yards and six touchdowns on 42 carries. He was the a Class 5A state champion in the triple jump (46 feet, 11 inches) in track and field. Richardson also played basketball in high school.

College career
Richardson played for the Jackson State Tigers from 2009 to 2012. He played in 43 games, starting 20, for the Tigers. He recorded 146 receptions for 2,722 yards (18.6 avg.) and 26 touchdowns.

Professional career

Kansas City Chiefs
Richardson signed with the Kansas City Chiefs on May 1, 2013 after going undrafted in the 2013 NFL Draft. He was released by the Chiefs on August 31, 2013.

Houston Texans
Richardson was signed to the Houston Texans' practice squad on November 13, 2013. He was signed to a future contract on December 30, 2013. He was released by the Texans on May 14, 2014.

Tennessee Titans
Richardson signed with the Tennessee Titans on June 13, 2014. He was released by the Titans on August 30 and signed to the team's practice squad on August 31, 2014. He was promoted to the active roster on December 18, 2014. On December 18, 2014, Richardson made his NFL debut against the Jacksonville Jaguars. Richardson was released by the Titans on September 5, 2015, and signed to the team's practice squad on September 6, 2015. He was promoted to the active roster on October 24, 2015, as the Titans released Chase Coffman. On November 28, 2015, he was waived by the Titans. Richardson was re-signed to the practice squad on December 22, 2015.

Arizona Cardinals
Richardson was signed by the Arizona Cardinals on June 6, 2016. On July 30, 2016, Richardson was released by the Cardinals.

San Diego Chargers
Richardson was signed by the San Diego Chargers on August 8, 2016. He was then waived/injured on August 18, 2016.

Personal life
Richardson has two daughters, Harmonee and Melody.

References

External links
NFL Draft Scout
"The 10 Least Consequential Athletes of the Decade" by Jon Bois, for SB Nation

Living people
1991 births
American football wide receivers
African-American players of American football
Jackson State Tigers football players
Kansas City Chiefs players
Houston Texans players
Tennessee Titans players
Arizona Cardinals players
San Diego Chargers players
Players of American football from Mississippi
Sportspeople from Natchez, Mississippi
21st-century African-American sportspeople